Everaldo Coelho (born March 25, 1978) is a Brazilian graphic designer and illustrator. He specializes in iconography, themes and user interface design.  Everaldo's works include general illustrations, comics, children's books, corporate design and many other areas. He is known in Linux circles for his "Crystal" icon theme.

Career
Everaldo worked for Conectiva and LindowsOS, and later as a freelance artist for SUSE, KDE, Mozilla and many other Linux-related projects. He has also worked on various projects for Mac OS X and Microsoft Windows XP platforms. In 2004, he joined Lindows.com as a full-time Lindows.com employee. Currently, he is the head of UX at Movile and consultant at Yellowicon Studio.

Everaldo started out as an illustrator. He has illustrated many children's books, school books, and magazines (including one specialized in Linux). In 1998, when Everaldo purchased his first PC, he saw a Mac in the computers store. Not understanding much about operating systems at the time, he searched the Internet for an OS to install on his new machine, coming across Linux. He installed Linux and WindowMaker, and began making themes.

In 2000 he made a few icons for Conectiva as a freelancer. Later, he was hired to work at their creation department. He designed Conectiva Linux's interface. His first KDE job was a splash screen, done in free time. Helio Castro sent it to KDE-Look, introducing Everaldo and KDE community to each other.

In the beginning he used CorelDRAW 9, running in Linux and GIMP. Later, he moved to Adobe Illustrator.

Crystal
Everaldo's signature style is the distinctive "crystal" look, mainly consisting in icons that appear to be made of highly reflective surfaces. The Crystal Icons theme that he created for KDE has been used in many different applications and websites. Crystal made a large impact on KDE and also boosted the mindshare of SVG icons on the desktop. Coelho would later create the Crystal Clear icon set, where the icons also appear to have a certain transparent quality.

When Everaldo started to work on Conectiva Linux 8, his intention was to create customized icons. Conectiva wanted to attract both Windows XP and Mac OS X users. This inspired him to focus on an intermediate concept of icons, "between realism of Mac OS X and cartoon colored style of XP". The result was the Crystal Icon set.

Before 2001, the default icon theme for KDE was Torsten Rahn's HiColor. In 2001, Frank Karlitschek came up with the website "KDE-Look", which introduced Rahn to Everaldo's Crystal. He discontinued the work on HiColor and joined Everaldo's work on Crystal. Crystal SVG became the default icon theme in KDE 3.1.

Crystal Icon examples

References

External links

Official website
Yellowicon Studios
Crystal icons

Brazilian graphic designers
Brazilian artists
Living people
KDE
1978 births
People from Curitiba